Serena Williams was the two-time defending champion and successfully defended her title, beating Carla Suárez Navarro in the final, 6–2, 6–0. Williams won the title for the record 8th time in her career. This is also the second to last WTA tournament played by Nicole Vaidišová, who received a wildcard and lost to Simona Halep in the second round.

Seeds
All seeds receive a bye into the second round.

Draw

Finals

Top half

Section 1

Section 2

Section 3

Section 4

Bottom half

Section 5

Section 6

Section 7

Section 8

Qualifying

Seeds

Qualifiers

Lucky loser
  Zheng Saisai

Qualifying draw

First qualifier

Second qualifier

Third qualifier

Fourth qualifier

Fifth qualifier

Sixth qualifier

Seventh qualifier

Eighth qualifier

Ninth qualifier

Tenth qualifier

Eleventh qualifier

Twelfth qualifier

References
 Main Draw
 Qualifying Draw

Women's Singles
Women in Florida